William J. Wood was a Canadian painter, etcher (May 26, 1877January 5, 1954)

Wood was a close  friend of several members of the Group of Seven: Arthur Lismer and A.Y. Jackson. In 1923 at one exhibition Wood is listed as a member of the Group of Seven, replacing Franz Johnston. Much of his work depicts Midland, Ontario, his hometown.  The Huronia Museum, in Midland, Ontario, has an extensive collection of his works.

References 

A Painter's Country: the autobiography of A.Y. Jackson. Clarke, Irwin & Company Ltd. Toronto, 1958

W.J. Wood: Paintings and Graphics. Christine Boyanoski and John Hartman. Art Gallery of Ontario, Catalogue of an exhibition held at the Art Gallery of Ontario, Oct. 22 – Dec. 4, 1983 and traveling to other galleries.

1877 births
1954 deaths
People from Midland, Ontario
20th-century Canadian painters
Canadian male painters
20th-century Canadian male artists